Nationwide public opinion polling have been commissioned in the leadup to the Taiwanese presidential election of 2012 by various organisations, including the Apple Daily, China Times, Global Views Magazine, Liberty Times, Era News and TVBS News. Election forecasts have also been released by various organisations, including the National Chengchi University, China Times, "Gallup" Market Research (not part of the global Gallup organization), Global Views Magazine, and TVBS News, through the use of different forecasting models.

It is important to note that in terms of political orientation, sources such as TVBS News, United Daily News, and China Times are considered to be pro-unification, while sources such as Liberty Times are considered to be pro-independence.

Opinion polling

Two-way race

Three-way race

Television debates performance rating
Note that the percentages reflect the proportion of valid respondents who rated a particular candidate as performing the best during the presidential and vice-presidential television debates.

Presidential debates

Vice-presidential debates

Election forecasting

Polling firm forecasts

Prediction market forecasts
Note that as the election forecast reports released by the National Chengchi University are based on models that involve the use of prediction markets as raw data, as opposed to opinion polling, the percentages may not add up to 100%.

Election forecast maps

References

External links
Apple Daily Polls
China Times Survey and Research Center
Era News Survey Center
Global Views Survey and Research Center
Liberty Times
TVBS News Poll Center
United Daily Times

Presidential election, 2008
Democratic Progressive Party
Taiwan
Opinion polling in Taiwan